Hyde or Hyda was a town of ancient Cappadocia and later of Lycaonia, near the frontiers of Galatia. It became a bishopric; no longer the seat of a residential bishop, it remains, under the name Hyda in Lycaonia, a titular see of the Roman Catholic Church. 

Its site is tentatively located near Akçaşehir, Karaman Province, Turkey.

References

Populated places in ancient Cappadocia
Populated places in ancient Lycaonia
Catholic titular sees in Asia
Former populated places in Turkey
Roman towns and cities in Turkey
Populated places of the Byzantine Empire
History of Karaman Province